The Cristo Rei of Dili (Christ the King of Dili) statue is a  colossal statue of Jesus Christ situated atop a globe at Cape Fatucama in Dili, East Timor. It is one of East Timor's main tourist attractions.

The statue was designed, and its construction supervised, by Mochamad Syailillah, who is better known as "Bolil". It was officially unveiled by President Suharto of Indonesia in 1996 as a gift from the Indonesian Government to the people of Timor Timur, the then Indonesian province.

Location 
The statue, and the globe on which it rests, are mounted on the peak of Cape Fatucama at the end of the Fatucama peninsula. The statue is accessible from the car park at Cristo Rei Beach, on the south side of the cape, inside the Bay of Dili, via a 570-step concrete staircase shaded by trees.

From the base of the statue, there are panoramic views back over the bay towards Dili in the south west, out over the transition between Ombai and Wetar Straits to Atauro Island in the north, and down to Jesus Backside Beach facing Wetar Strait in the east.

History 
The idea of constructing the Cristo Rei statue was proposed by José Abílio Osório Soares, then the Governor of East Timor, to President Suharto. The statue was intended as a gift to East Timor for the 20th anniversary of its integration into Indonesia; the anniversary was due to take place on 17 July 1996.

Suharto put national airline Garuda Indonesia in charge of leading the project. Garuda was given the responsibility to find capital for funding the project, and raised 1.1 billion rupiah. However, that was not sufficient to erect the statue, and contributions from East Timorese civil servants and businessmen were needed to complete the project, which eventually cost more than 5 billion rupiah.

Meanwhile, Garuda engaged Mochamad Syailillah, better known as "Bolil", to design and build the statue. Bolil, whose workspace was in Bandung, had never previously constructed a large statue. He travelled to East Timor to inspect Cape Fatucama, which the Governor had nominated as the proposed site. The terrain at the Cape was of suitable strength for the erection of a large and tall statue.

Taking that terrain and calculations of the very strong local winds into account, Bolil designed the statue and made a prototype of it. The design portrayed the subject wrapped in a robe. The face of the statue proved to be difficult to render; after much effort, including consultation with the Communion of Churches in Indonesia headquarters in Jakarta, the artist gravitated towards Greek and Roman facial features, and aimed at simplicity.

Almost a year of work was required to create the statue's body, which was fabricated by 30 workers in Sukaraja, Bandung, to the completed design. The body was made of 27 separate copper sections, which were then loaded onto three container trailers and shipped to Dili aboard a chartered ship. Installation of the statue by the team from Bandung, including the globe and a  cross, took about three months.

Prior to the unveiling of the statue, East Timorese resistance leader Xanana Gusmão, who was then being held in prison in Jakarta, was scathingly critical of it:

The statue was unveiled on 15 October 1996. Bishop Belo, together with President Suharto and Governor Soares, used a helicopter to witness its revelation directly from the air. A few days earlier, the Norwegian Nobel Committee had embarrassed the Indonesian government by awarding the Nobel Peace Prize for 1996 to Bishop Belo and José Ramos-Horta "... to honour their sustained and self-sacrificing contributions for a small but oppressed people." In his own public comments on the statue, Bishop Belo said:

Before East Timor ceased to be a province of Indonesia, the statue was given an award by the Indonesian World Records Museum for being the tallest statue in the country. Since East Timor regained independence in 2002, the statue has been not destroyed, but, instead, preserved and re-presented as a tourist attraction.

Timorese argue that the statue now 'belongs' to East Timor, regardless of its originators and their purposes. It is the source of considerable native pride, and, as "... an iconic symbol of the country and its Capital City of Dili ...", is now a haunt of locals as well as being one of East Timor's main tourist attractions. Even Gusmão has changed his position; while he was serving as Prime Minister of East Timor between 2007 and 2015, his government supported the renovation of the statue.

Symbolism 

The statue is now also seen as a physical symbol of the figure of Christ, of suffering, and of the Catholic faith that is now part of being East Timorese.  It is gesturing with embracing arms, and is oriented towards the west, which, as some have observed, is the direction of Jakarta. However, the artist has said that the Governor had asked that the statue face towards Dili. The arms and hands of the statue are held in place with steel wire rope, to withstand the wind pressure; there is also a wind vent in the armpit of the statue's robe, linked by a pipe to another vent at the back of the robe.

Visitors climbing the staircase from Cristo Rei Beach to the statue pass 14 stations, which are places of prayer for Catholics. The 14 stations symbolise the Stations of the Cross passed by Jesus Christ on his walk to Calvary or Golgotha on the day of his crucifixion.

Gallery

See also
 List of statues of Jesus
 List of tallest statues

References

External links

Mountain monuments and memorials
Monuments and memorials in East Timor
Religious buildings and structures in East Timor
Colossal statues of Jesus
Dili
Christ the King
Buildings and structures completed in 1996
1996 establishments in Indonesia
Maps in art